David James Benedict Hartley (born 28 March 1963) is a former English List A cricketer.  Hartley was a right-handed batsman who bowled leg break.  He was born at Ruscombe, Berkshire.

In 1982, Hartley played 3 Second XI Championship fixtures for the Middlesex Second XI, but this did not earn him a contract with the county.

Hartley made his Minor Counties Championship debut for Berkshire in 1987 against Cornwall.  From 1987 to 2000, he represented the county in 65 Minor Counties Championship matches, the last of which came in the 2000 Championship when Berkshire played Wales Minor Counties.  Hartley also played in the MCCA Knockout Trophy for Berkshire.  His debut in that competition came in 1988 when Berkshire played Oxfordshire.  From 1988 to 1997, he represented the county in 5 Trophy matches, the last of which came when Berkshire played Shropshire in the 1997 MCCA Knockout Trophy.

Additionally, he also played List-A matches for Berkshire.  His List-A debut for the county came against Yorkshire in the 1988 NatWest Trophy.  From 1988 to 1997, he represented the county in 7 List-A matches, with his final List-A match coming in the 1997 NatWest Trophy when Berkshire played Lancashie at Old Trafford.  In his 7 matches, he scored 8 runs at a batting average of 2.66, with a high score of 8.  With the ball he took 4 wickets at a bowling average of 75.25, with best figures of 2/35.

References

External links
David Hartley at Cricinfo
David Hartley at CricketArchive

1963 births
Living people
People from Ruscombe
English cricketers
Berkshire cricketers